Phyllis Hodgkinson was a female English international table tennis player.

She won a silver medal in the women's team event and a bronze medal in the women's doubles with Doris Jordan at the 1938 World Table Tennis Championships.

She was an all-round sportswoman playing lawn tennis for Kingsway and Lensbury, badminton, cricket for  Gunnersbury Ladies and field hockey for Chiswick.

She married Keith Lauder in 1947 and became Phyllis Lauder.

See also
 List of England players at the World Team Table Tennis Championships
 List of World Table Tennis Championships medalists

References

English female table tennis players
World Table Tennis Championships medalists